"Until the Day I Die" is the debut single by American rock band Story of the Year. It is the second track on their debut album, Page Avenue (2003). "Until the Day I Die" was released to radio on August 12, 2003. A music video was released along with the single in 2003. The song received airplay and has been used in popular media extensively, including a trailer for the film Friday Night Lights.

Charts
"Until the Day I Die" peaked at #12 on the Billboard Alternative Songs chart.  It also peaked at #35 on the Active rock chart.

References

2003 debut singles
Story of the Year songs
2003 songs
Maverick Records singles
Song recordings produced by John Feldmann